Brunori is an Italian surname. Notable people with the surname include:

Federigo Brunori (1566–1649), Italian painter
Matteo Brunori Sandri (born 1994), Italian footballer

Italian-language surnames